Tamanar (  is a rural municipality in Essaouira Province, Marrakesh-Safi, Morocco. 

According to the 2004 census it has a population of 9,984.

Notable people 
Fatima Tihihit, Moroccan singer in Tachelhit amazigh language.

References

Populated places in Essaouira Province
Municipalities of Morocco